Andre Begemann and Jonathan Eysseric were the defending champions but only Begemann chose to defend his title, partnering Rameez Junaid. Begemann lost in the quarterfinals to Romain Arneodo and Quentin Halys.

Sander Gillé and Joran Vliegen won the title after defeating Arneodo and Halys 6–3, 4–6, [10–2] in the final.

Seeds

Draw

References
 Main Draw

Internationaux de Tennis de Vendée - Doubles
2018 Doubles